Ottawa County Courthouse may refer to:
 Ottawa County Courthouse (Ohio), listed on the NRHP in Ohio
 Ottawa County Courthouse (Oklahoma), listed on the NRHP in Oklahoma